was a town located in Tsuna District, Hyōgo Prefecture, Japan.

As of 2003, the town had an estimated population of 16,395 and a density of 296.90 persons per km2. The total area was 55.22 km2.

On April 1, 2005, Tsuna, along with the towns of Awaji, Higashiura, Hokudan and Ichinomiya (all from Tsuna District), was merged to create the city of Awaji and no longer exists as an independent municipality.

Points of interest
 Kiseki No Hoshi Greenhouse

External links
 Official website of Awaji in Japanese

Dissolved municipalities of Hyōgo Prefecture
Awaji, Hyōgo